Charles Lownds (6 March 1915 – 15 August 1962) was a South African cricketer. He played in five first-class matches for Border in 1947/48 and 1948/49.

See also
 List of Border representative cricketers

References

External links
 

1915 births
1962 deaths
South African cricketers
Border cricketers
Cricketers from East London, Eastern Cape